Geoff Weigand (born 1964 in Sydney, Australia) is an Australian rock climber and road cyclist.

Career 
By the age of 16 (1981), he was one of the leading climbers in Australia with the onsight ascent of Toyland, 25, considered by most to be the hardest climb in New South Wales (NSW) at the time,

He added numerous of 1st ascents (F.A.). Some are at Bombo Quarry, NSW, he redpointed Hangman (27)., Krondorf Theft (25), and Abstractions (25). At Cosmic County, with Aesthetic Images (25), Crosswords (24), Highlights (24), Fading Light (24), Blackboard (24) and Letters to the Editor (25) - all developed in December 1981. He also repeated the best and hardest of his contemporaries' routes (at the time) including ascent of Hollow Men (26). While at Mt. Piddington, he established the first of its difficulty, Social Climbing (26)

He also "free solo" climbed The Janicepts (22) at Mt. Victoria, and Exhibition Wall (21) at Mt. York.

He was the subject of a "60 Minutes" (Australia) climbing story on soloing filmed at Cosmic County and Blue Mountains. In this story the anchorman posits "Is this Sport or Madness?" Weigand is quoted as saying "It's both and neither. It's madness to the everyday person. I'm not the everyday person."

At Mt. Arapiles in Australia he climbed No Exit (26) while still in high school. In February 1986 he established Shimmering - the first grade 28 in New South Wales.

At Joshua Tree, he onsight soloed each of the Ski Tracks (5.10/5.11) then the crack route Acid Crack (5.13a). In Yosemite Valley, with fellow Aussie Kim Carrigan, they did the first continuous no falls, free ascent of the Rostrum (5.12). At the Cookie Cliffs they climbed Americas Cup (5.12c) so named to commemorate the winning of the yacht race series by Australia over the U.S.A. for the first time

At Smith Rock, Oregon, he arrived in early summer '85 with Johnny Woodward and Kim Carrigan with the local core of Alan Watts, Chris Grover, and Brooke Sandhal.

He made the first 1-day ascent of Chain Reaction (5.12c) and Latest Rage (5.12). He and Woodward also teamed up for the 2nd ascent of the classic Heinous Cling (5.12c) and a no falls ascent of Split images (5.12d). Weigand did the 1st repeat of Darkness at Noon (5.13a) - all are Watts creations-this confirmed the work of Alan Watts as having developed the leading American sport climbing area and help put Smith Rock on the map as the first premier sport climbing area.

Weigand was profiled in Rock magazine's Jan-Jun 1989 issue noted as "currently at the top of the Australian rockclimbing hit parade" (Chris Baxter, Managing Editor)

He participated in the 1992 Masters competition in Chambery, France as a pre-Olympic climbing challenge held one-week prior to the games in France's bid to get rock climbing entered as an Olympic sport for the 1998 Seoul, Korean summer games. He placed 19th in difficulty and 5th in speed.

Also in 1992 at the China Wall in Logan Canyon, UT he completed Blackout (5.14b/8c) named by Boone Speed "The grade of the route is irrelevant, insignificant compared to the pure intensity of the performance. What matters is that Geoff punched it past his personal limits, and, in the process, inspired us to do the same. I wish everyone luck in the search for their own 'Black Out'."

Career Highlights

1st Ascents 
 Hangman (27) 1st Ascent Bombo Quarry (1982), NSW
 Slinkin Leopard (28) - (potentially equal to any route at the time), First Ascent
 Power Corruption and Lies (27), Mt. Arapiles
 Cherry Boys (27), Grampians, First Ascent
 Model Phantom (27), First Ascent, Mt. Arapiles
 Security Jerks (27), First Ascent (1984)
 Yesterday Direct (28), First Ascent
 Microcosm (27), Wolgan Valley NSW, first free ascent
 Jet Lag (29) 1st Ascent – Arapiles (1984)
 Straight Outta Compton (29) 1st Ascent – Arapiles (1985)
 Slit Your Wrists (5.13b/29) 1st Ascent Smith Rock  
 Villain (5.14a) 1st Ascent {1990} - Smith Rock 
 Hurrikan (5.13b/c) 1st Ascent {1985} - Frankenjura, Germany (1985)
 Time's Up (5.13a/28), 1st Ascent - Smith Rock                   
 The Ashes (7c+), Kilnsey Crag, First Ascent described in High magazine, August issue 1989
 Churning in the Ozone (5.13b) 1st Ascent – Smith Rock
 Body Count (5.13+) 1st Ascent (1991) - AF Canyon
 Cop Killer (5.13d) 1st Ascent - AF Canyon
 Blackout (5.14a) 1st Ascent {1992} - Logan Canyon
 Trench Warfare (5.13c) 1st Ascent {1992}- Logan Canyon
 The Love Boat (5.13d) 1st Ascent - AF Canyon
 You're Terminated (31), Mt. Arapiles, First Ascent
 Aesthetic Images (25) 1st Ascent - Cosmic County
 Letters To the Editor (25) 1st Ascent - Cosmic County
 Shimmering (28) 1st Ascent - Cosmic County 
 Trilobite (26) 1st Ascent - Cosmic County 
 Dog Logic (25),First Ascent, Dog Wall, Red Rocks, NV,
 No Dogs Allowed (5.12b/26), First Ascent, Dog Wall, Red Rocks, NV,
 The Deep West (27), First Ascent, Dog Wall, Red Rocks, NV,
 The Boschton Marathon (27), First Ascent, Dog Wall, Red Rocks, NV,
 Next to Nothing (26) 1st Ascent – Mt York
 Crosswords (24) 1st Ascent – Cosmic County
 Fading Light (24),1st Ascent – Cosmic County,
 Paralyzed (24) 1st Ascent – Cosmic County
 Kid Dynamo (22) 1st Ascent  - Cosmic County  
 Americas Cup (5.12c)1st Ascent Cookie Cliff - Yosemite (w/ K. Carrigan)(1985)
 White Wedding (5.14a), 1989, Smith Rock, one of only 3 climbs of that grade in U.S.A. at time of establishing route, first time an Australian has broken the 5.14 barrier. Weigand rates as 32/33 in Australian grading

1st Ascent, Solo & Onsight 
 Short and Sharp (25), Arapiles, solo onsight, First Ascent
 Herbs and Spices (24 -now 23), Arapiles, onsight, First Ascent (solo)

1st Solo Ascent 
 The Janicepts (22) 1st solo, Onsight - Mt Piddington Blue Mountains – John Ewbank’s, original Hardest Route in Australia

"Big Walls" - 1st Ascent/ 1st Free/ Free 
 The Rostrum (V 5.12) 1st Free Ascent – Yosemite (1985)(w/K. Carrigan) 
 The Shadow (V 5.13b) 1st Ascent – Squamish Chief (1988) (w/Peter Croft)

Other Ascents 
 India (29), 4th Ascent
 1st onsight ascent of Grace (26), Mitchells Ridge
 White Trash (25), solo
 Serpentine (31), Mt. Stapylton, second ascent
 Superdirectissima (31, 32), Malham Cove, Second ascent

Cited Competitions 
 1988: Snowbird International, UT, the first climber in the 1st International climbing event in the U.S., 8th Place
 1989: Snowbird World Cup, UT, 9th place
 1991: Phoenix 9th Annual Bouldering (the first bouldering contest to receive ASCF sanctioning), 3rd place
 1991: Hueco Tanks Rock Rodeo, TX - 1st place, tied with Dale Goddard
 1992: Chambery Rockmaster, FRA, 19th difficulty, 5th speed - France's attempt to have climbing be an Olympic sport for 1998 Seoul games

References 

1964 births
Australian rock climbers
Sportspeople from Sydney
Living people